Live in London 1986 is a live album by the American singer/songwriter Suzanne Vega. It was recorded April 27, 1986, and was released on both Vinyl and CD. It registered at #93 on Australian music charts.

Track listing 
 "Left of Centre"
 "Neighborhood Girls"
 "Straight Lines"
 "Black Widow Station"
 "Knight Moves"
 "Cracking"

References 

1986 live albums
Suzanne Vega albums